William John Sass-Davies (born 17 February 2000) is a Welsh professional footballer who plays as a defender for Woking on loan from Crewe Alexandra. He has also represented Wales at under-19 and under-21 levels.

Career
Sass-Davies signed professional terms with Crewe in July 2017. After being on the substitutes bench for the opening five games of the 2017–18 season, he made his first-team debut, aged 17, on 29 August 2017, being named in the starting line-up in an EFL Trophy group stage game against Newcastle United U21s at Gresty Road.

In February 2018 he joined Colwyn Bay on loan.

He joined Northern Premier League side Leek Town on loan in November 2018.

In January 2019 he joined FC United of Manchester on loan making his debut, and being voted man of the match, the next day in a victory in a league match against Bradford Park Avenue. In March 2019, he joined Altrincham on loan and made one appearance, as a second half substitute, in a 1–0 win at York City. On 19 April 2019, Sass-Davies made his first League start for Crewe, playing in a 2–0 win over Yeovil Town at Gresty Road.

He was offered a new contract by Crewe at the end of the 2018-19 season. During the 2019–20 season, Sass-Davies had a loan spell at AFC Telford United, and in February 2020 went on a month's loan to Northern Premier League side Ashton United, making his debut against Witton Albion on 8 February 2020.

Sass-Davies scored his first professional goal, for Crewe, in a 1–2 defeat by Lincoln City in the first round of the EFL Cup at Gresty Road on 5 September 2020.

On 7 November 2020, he rejoined Altrincham on loan for a month. He made seven league appearances during his second loan spell at the club. On 3 December 2020, Sass-Davies was recalled by Crewe Alexandra following injuries to several  first-team players. 

On 9 February 2021, Sass-Davies joined National League side Yeovil Town on a one-month loan deal, making his debut in a 1–0 defeat at Eastleigh later the same day. He scored his first league goal for Yeovil in their 4–1 win at Barnet on 2 March 2021. The loan was then extended for a further month, and eventually continued until the end of Yeovil's season in late May. Meanwhile, on 13 May 2021, Crewe announced that it had triggered a contract extension.

Sass-Davies was sent off after 13 minutes of Crewe's second game of the 2021–2022 season, an EFL Cup first round tie at Hartlepool United on 10 August 2021. He made his next appearance in the EFL Cup second round tie at Premier League Leeds United, where Crewe conceded three late goals to lose 3–0, but did not make a league appearance for Crewe (his first in three seasons) until 25 September 2021 in a 1–1 draw at Rotherham United. On 6 January 2022, the club announced Sass-Davies had signed an extended deal through to 2024. In February 2022, he suffered a blood clot in his calf ruling him out for the remainder of the season. 

On 4 March 2023, Sass-Davies joined National League third placed side Woking on a 28-day loan deal, making his debut as a late substitute in Woking's 1-0 win at Yeovil Town on the same day.

International career
He was called up by the Wales national under-19 football team in September 2017 to play against Iceland, starting four matches, including a UEFA European Under-19 Championship qualifier against Kazakhstan on 13 November 2017.

In March 2021, Sass-Davies was called up to the Wales national under-21 football team for the first time, playing all 90 minutes in Wales's 2–1 defeat by Ireland at Colliers Park, Wrexham on 26 March 2021. Manager Paul Bodin then selected a largely unchanged squad, including Sass-Davies, for the side's Euro 2023 qualifying game against Moldova on 4 June 2021; Sass-Davies played the whole goal-less draw at Stebonheath Park, Llanelli. In August 2021, Sass-Davies was called up for the under-21 side to play against Bulgaria in Sofia on 7 September 2021, and scored the second goal in Wales's 4–0 victory. He was then called up for under-21 matches against Moldova and the Netherlands on 8 and 12 October 2021 respectively, earning two further caps, and for under-21 matches against Gibraltar and Switzerland a month later.

Career statistics

References

2000 births
People from Abergele
Sportspeople from Conwy County Borough
Living people
Welsh footballers
Wales youth international footballers
Wales under-21 international footballers
Association football defenders
Crewe Alexandra F.C. players
Leek Town F.C. players
Colwyn Bay F.C. players
F.C. United of Manchester players
Ashton United F.C. players
AFC Telford United players
Altrincham F.C. players
Yeovil Town F.C. players
Woking F.C. players
English Football League players
National League (English football) players
Northern Premier League players